was a software house based in Takarazuka, Japan, best known for being the original publishers of Sokoban. 

Falcon, a company which former president Hiroyuki Imabayashi is currently involved in, owns the trademark and copyright to Thinking Rabbit's work.

Games
Sokoban (NEC PC-8801, 1982)
T.N.T. Bomb Bomb (Fujitsu FM-7, 1984)
Sokoban 2 (NEC PC-8801, Fujitsu FM-7 and Fujitsu FM-8, 1984)
Keyhole Murder (NEC PC-8801 and Fujitsu FM-7, 1985)
Jikai Shounen Met Mag (Famicom Disk System, 1987)
The Man I Love (NEC PC-8801, MSX2 and Sharp X68000, 1988)
Casablanca: Ni Ai Wo Satsujinsha Ha Jikuu Wo Koete (MSX2 and Sharp X68000, 1988)
8 Eyes (Nintendo Entertainment System, 1988)
Hydlide 3 Special Version (Sharp X68000, 1990)
Mega Man II (Game Boy, 1991)
Maten Densetsu: Senritsu no Ooparts (Super Famicom, 1995)
Madeleine (NEC PC-8801, date unknown)
A Clown Murder Case (NEC PC-8801 and Sharp X68000, date unknown)
UWC (NES, unreleased)

External links
  Official website

Video game companies established in 1982
Defunct video game companies of Japan
Video game publishers
1982 establishments in Japan